Edwin Benjamin Salmon (born 19 December 1943) is a former field hockey player from New Zealand who competed at two Olympic Games.

Salmon was born in Whangārei.  At the 1968 Summer Olympics in Mexico City he was a member of the Olympic team that finished seventh and at the 1972 Summer Olympics in Munich he was a member of the team that finished ninth.

References

External links
 

New Zealand male field hockey players
Olympic field hockey players of New Zealand
Field hockey players at the 1968 Summer Olympics
Field hockey players at the 1972 Summer Olympics
1943 births
Living people
Field hockey players from Whangārei